Arnaldo Lucentini (7 July 1930 – 6 August 1981) was an Italian footballer who played as a midfielder. On 25 November 1951, he represented the Italy national football team on the occasion of a friendly match against Switzerland in a 1–1 away draw.

References

1930 births
1981 deaths
Italian footballers
Italy international footballers
Association football midfielders
U.C. Sampdoria players
ACF Fiorentina players
U.S. Triestina Calcio 1918 players
S.S. Lazio players
S.S. Arezzo players
Sportspeople from the Province of Macerata
Footballers from Marche